Renata Janina Przemyk (born February 10, 1966, in Bielsko-Biała) is a Polish singer and songwriter.

Biography
In Bielsko-Biała she attended primary and secondary school. She enjoyed her childhood together with her parents, grandmother and brothers. After finishing school, Renata moved to Katowice and began to study Czech philology at University of Śląsk.

In 1994 she moved to Cracow, and at the end of 1999 she decided to lead a quiet life in the country near Cracow, away from the fuss of a big city, which enabled her to compose, make arrangements of her own songs and bring up her daughter in a peaceful atmosphere.

Career
Her career as a singer started when she was a teenager, by singing with local rock bands. However, she developed the real calling for music during her studies when she was inspired by the music of Tom Waits, Talking Heads and Frank Zappa. As a result of it, she started a band named "Ya Hozna" in 1989.

Despite the fact, that the group lasted only for a year, they managed to release an album entitled "Ya Hozna", the album that revealed a unique and original musical style of Renata Przemyk. After her music began to catch on, she started her solo career.

As an independent artist Renata has recorded and edited the following albums: "Mało zdolna szansonistka" (1992), "Tylko kobieta" (1994), "Andergrant" (1996), "Hormon" (1999), "Blizna" (2001), "Balladyna" (2002) – soundtrack from a play directed by Jan Machulski, "The best of" (2003) – a compilation of her most interesting songs, "Unikat" (2006).

From the beginning of her artistic path, she has been accompanied by her dearest friend and manager – Anna Saraniecka, who at the same time is the author of all lyrics. Mature and wise lyrics have the same importance for Renata's songs as the music, and they are an integral part of creating the unusual nature of her work.

Most of Renata's albums were awarded with a status of "golden album" for selling over 50.000 copies. Moreover, they were nominated and awarded many times – mostly for artistic individuality. She was placed on the list of most influential artists of the past millennium.

From the beginning of her career, the singer has also won numerous awards in various festivals in which she took part, including first prize in the festival in Cracow, "Karolinka" in Opole and "Bursztynowy Slowik" in Sopot.

As an artist that connects rock sounds with poetry and theatrical performance she could perform both on the stage of a rock festival in Jarocin, and prestigious festivals of stage song that took place in Wrocław and Köln. She has given concerts in France (Normandy, Brittany, Paris) and in the USA (New York) but because of the lyrics being written in her native language, she prefers to perform in front of the Polish audiences, which can fully appreciate the words and also sing the songs with her.

Although she has got many interests such as: art, cinema, 19th and 20th century literature, modern theater and drawing her own graphics, music is always the most important for her. She has cooperated with many artists but if it's for her art – she's always the only one who produces her ventures and decides about their character.

It is hard to classify her music – neither rock nor alternative nor poetry can describe what's deep inside it. She calls her music "an everlasting search for tones, sounds, emotions and climates not similar to anything that had been made before". That's why each album is different from the previous one. Nevertheless, there is always one motif in common – on every album we can hear the sound of accordion, an instrument the artist likes, despite all trends and fashions.

An individual and unique style of Renata's music has its origin in post-punk tones. However, the artist has been constantly using various instruments in her musical career. The electronic sounds were used for the first time by Renata on an album entitled "Hormon" in 1999, which at the same time was the first album composed by her. Since then she and the author of lyrics Anna Saraniecka have been the only "parents" of Renata's successes.

What is more, in voting contests by two most important Polish weeklies – Polityka and Wprost, Renata has been chosen one of the most important artists of the last century.

Discography

Studio albums

Compilation albums

Collaborative albums

Live albums

Soundtracks

References

External links 
 Official website (English version)
 Official website (Polish version)

1966 births
Living people
Musicians from Bielsko-Biała
Polish women singers
Sung poetry of Poland